Hot air balloon festivals are held annually in many places throughout the year, allowing hot air balloons operators to gather- as well as for the general public- to participate in various activities. They can include races;  evening "night glows", or "glowdeos" (in the US), in which balloons are fired while remaining tethered to the ground; and rides.

References

External links 
Hot air balloon festival listings - primarily North America
Hot air balloon festival listings - primarily Europe
Worldwide Hot air balloon festival listings
Ballooning over Italy
Hot Air Balloon Festival Pampanga
Luxor International Hot Air Balloon Festival
Hod-Hod Soliman Balloons 26th anniversary
Winthrop Balloon Festival or Winthrop Balloon Roundup

Walla Walla Balloon Festival

Lists of festivals by topic
Sports festivals
Air shows